Maylandia chrysomallos is a species of cichlid endemic to Lake Malawi where it is only known from rocky areas around Mumbo Island.  This species can reach a length of  SL.  It is also found in the aquarium trade.

References

chrysomallos
Fish of Lake Malawi
Fish of Malawi
Fish described in 1997
Taxobox binomials not recognized by IUCN
Taxonomy articles created by Polbot